Lešak is a town settlement of Leposavić in northern Kosovo. It has population of 2,180, with an ethnic Serb majority.

Lešak was, along with the Leposavić municipality, ceded to SAP Kosovo in 1959.

Notes and references
Notes'

References

Villages in Leposavić
Serb communities in Kosovo